Once Again is a 2016 Philippine television drama romantic fantasy series broadcast by GMA Network. Directed by Don Michael Perez, it stars Janine Gutierrez and Aljur Abrenica. It premiered on May 2, 2016 on the network's Telebabad line up replacing That's My Amboy. The series concluded on July 22, 2016 with a total of 59 episodes. It was replaced by Descendants of the Sun in its timeslot.

The series is streaming online on YouTube.

Premise
Reign and Edgar loves each other. However, Reign's family will arrange her marriage to Lukas. As Edgar and Reign fight their way through the tussle, the two lovers lose their lives because of Lukas. They will meet each other again after twenty years in a different time and place as two different people as Des and Aldrin with the same love for each other.

Cast and characters

Lead cast
 Janine Gutierrez as Regina "Reign" Soriano / Desiree "Des" Mateo / Paula Carbonnel
 Aljur Abrenica as Edgardo "Edgar" del Mundo / Aldrin Sanchez

Supporting cast
 Jean Garcia as Madel Mateo
 Sheryl Cruz as Agnes Lacson-Carbonnel
 Chanda Romero as Carmen Mateo
 Joko Diaz as Lucas Carbonnel
 Emilio Garcia as Tony Sanchez
 Timmy Cruz as Nancy Sanchez
 Thea Tolentino as Celeste Lacson Carbonnel-Sanchez
 Jeric Gonzales as JV Sanchez

Recurring cast
 Lovely Rivero as Vicky Pineda 
 Analyn Barro as Diana "Daday" Gonzalvo
 Yasser Marta as Eric Alfonso 
 Mariam Al-Alawi as Joan Torres
 Shelly Hipolito as Phoebe Sanchez
 Gerald Madrid as Jason Gutierrez

Guest cast
 Christopher de Leon as Ricardo Soriano
 Sharmaine Arnaiz as Violeta Soriano
 Therese Malvar as Lynnel Soriano
 Bembol Roco as Romulo del Mundo
 Irma Adlawan as Cecilia del Mundo
 Faith da Silva as Carol del Mundo
 Ar Angel Aviles as Liza del Mundo
 Karen delos Reyes as adult Liza del Mundo
 Dayara Shane as young Paula/ Des
 Zarah Mae Deligero as young Daday
 Will Ashley de Leon as young Aldrin
 Phytos Ramirez as young Lucas
 Lharby Policarpio as young Jason
 Archie Adamos as Lando
 Prince Clemente as Gilbert
 Lilia Cuntapay as Impong Sula
 Sheila Marie Rodriguez as Patricia

Episodes

May 2016

June 2016

July 2016

Episodes notes

Ratings
According to AGB Nielsen Philippines' Mega Manila household television ratings, the pilot episode of Once Again earned a 17.3% rating. While the final episode scored a 19.8% rating.

References

External links
  
 

2016 Philippine television series debuts
2016 Philippine television series endings
Filipino-language television shows
GMA Network drama series
Philippine romance television series
Television shows set in the Philippines